Burning the Books: A History of the Deliberate Destruction of Knowledge is a 2020 book by Bodleian Libraries Director Richard Ovenden on the history of intentional recorded knowledge destruction. It was shortlisted for the 2021 Wolfson History Prize.

Bibliography

References

Works cited by the book

External links 
 

2020 non-fiction books
Belknap Press books
English-language books
Book censorship
John Murray (publishing house) books